Hauteville-sur-Fier (literally Hauteville on Fier) is a commune in the Haute-Savoie department in the Auvergne-Rhône-Alpes region in south-eastern France.

Geography
The Fier forms part of the commune's south-western border.

See also
Communes of the Haute-Savoie department

References

Communes of Haute-Savoie